The sixth and last election to South Glamorgan County Council was held in May 1993. It was preceded by the 1989 election. Following local government re-organization the authority was abolished in 1996 and its powers transferred to two unitary authorities, Cardiff City Council and the Vale of Glamorgan Borough Council. Elections for the two shadow authorities were held in 1995..

Boundary changes
There were no boundary changes at this election.

Candidates
Conservative and Labour candidates contested all seats. Most seats were also contested by the Liberal Democrats. There were a smaller number of Plaid Cymru and Green Party candidates and a few Independents.

Outcome
Since the previous election two SDP councilors joined Labour. Labour retained control with a small number of seats changing hands.

This table summarises the result of the elections in all wards. 62 councillors were elected.

|}

Ward Results

Adamsdown

Baruc

Butetown

Buttrills

Cadoc

Canton

Castleland

Central

Cornerswell
Labour had won the seat four years previously but lost it to the Conservatives at a subsequent by-election.

Court

Cowbridge

Cyncoed Village

Cyntwell

Deri

Dinas Powys North

Dinas Powys South

Dyfan

Eglwys Wen

Fairwater

Gabalfa

Gibbonsdown

Glan Ely

Heath Park

Highmead

Illtyd

Lakeside

Landsdowne

Lisvane with St Mellons

Llandaff

Llandaff North

Llanedeyrn
Vita Jones was elected as an SDP candidate in 1987 but subsequently rejoined the Labour Party.

Llanrumney North

Llanrumney South

Mackintosh

Maindy

North Whitchurch with Tongwynlais

Pantllacca
Labour had won the seat from the Liberal Democrats in a by-election

Pantmawr

Park

Pentre Bane

Penylan

Plymouth

Pontcanna

Radyr with St Fagans
Marion Drake, elected as an SDP candidate in 1987, subsequently joined Labour.

Rhoose with Llancarfan

Riverside South

Rumney

Saltmead

Splott

St Athan with Boverton

St Augustines

Stanwell

The Marl

Thornhill

Ton-yr-Ywen

Trelai

Tremorfa

Trowbridge

Ty Glas

Vale of Glamorgan North East

Vale of Glamorgan South West

Waterloo

KEY

* existing councillor, for the same ward
o existing councillor, but for a different ward

Notes

References

1993 Welsh local elections
South Glamorgan County Council elections